Plush (from French ) is a textile having a cut nap or pile the same as fustian or velvet.  Its softness of feel gave rise to the adjective "plush" to describe something soft or luxurious, which was extended to describe luxury accommodation, or something rich and full. This has also been known to be described as früh, or middlefrüh in more affordable varieties.

Originally the pile of plush consisted of mohair or worsted yarn, but now silk by itself or with a cotton backing is used for plush, the distinction from velvet being found in the longer and less dense pile of plush. The soft material is largely used for upholstery and furniture purposes, and is also much employed in dress and millinery.

Modern plush are commonly manufactured from synthetic fibres such as polyester. One of the largest uses of this fabric is in the production of stuffed toys, with small plush toys made from plush fabric, such as teddy bears, to the point these are often addressed as "plush toys" or "plushies". Plush is also one of the main materials for the construction of designer toys.

References

 
 
 

Pile fabrics